Nobody's Darling is a 1943 American musical film directed by Anthony Mann and written by Olive Cooper. The film stars Mary Lee, Louis Calhern, Gladys George, Jackie Moran, Lee Patrick and Benny Bartlett. The film was released on August 27, 1943, by Republic Pictures.

Plot
Husband-and-wife acting team Curtis and Eve Farnsworth have a daughter, Janie, who attends a very exclusive boarding school. Janie is frustrated because her parents pay more attention to acting than to her and because Chuck Grant, in charge of the school's upcoming musical production, tells Janie she can't act, can't dance and isn't glamorous enough to be in the show.

Janie eventually becomes aware that her father's career is flourishing but her mother's is not. Rather than accept roles opposite a younger co-star, Curtis decides to retire without telling his wife why. Janie, meanwhile, ignored by her parents but encouraged by principal Miss Pennington, turns out to be a very good singer, so now Chuck does want her to perform.

Confusion reigns when word is falsely spread that Janie and Chuck are also romantically involved. Their angry parents come to the school to withdraw them. Pennington persuades them to wait until the show, and when they finally see how talented Janie is, everybody ends up happy.

Cast  
Mary Lee as Janie Farnsworth
Louis Calhern as Curtis Farnsworth
Gladys George as Eve Hawthorne
Jackie Moran as Charles Grant Jr.
Lee Patrick as Miss Pennington
Benny Bartlett as Julius aka The Deacon 
Marcia Mae Jones as Lois
Roberta Smith as Texas Gleason
Lloyd Corrigan as Charles Grant Sr.
Jonathan Hale as Jason Rhodes
Sylvia Field as Miss Campbell
Billy Dawson as Jerry Hoke
Beverly Boyd as Corabelle Fiefield

References

External links
 

1943 films
1940s English-language films
American musical films
1943 musical films
Republic Pictures films
Films directed by Anthony Mann
American black-and-white films
1940s American films
English-language musical films